( A Secret Treatise of Renga Principles) is a text on renga poetics. It was written by Nijō Yoshimoto around 1349. It had a great influence on the development of renga.

Development
Yoshimoto learned waka from Ton'a and renga from Gusai and Kyūsei. While he authored several treatises on waka, it is for renga that he is best known.  By the age of thirty, he was regarded as an authority on the subject.

In 1345, Yoshimoto composed . This text served as the draft for Renri Hishō, and over the next four years he slightly revised and edited it until it became Renri Hishō. The differences between the two texts are extremely minimal.

The text currently remains in a single manuscript in the  collection. It is a mid-Muromachi period copy.

Contents
The text begins with a kanbun preface by Priest Gen'e and concludes with an afterword by Kyūsei. The main text consists of two major sections: general discourse on renga ranging from history to ways to learn, and rules for composing renga.

Notes

References

 
 
 

Late Middle Japanese texts
Japanese poetry